Pervomaysky is a rural locality (a settlement) in Krasnoyarsky Selsoviet, Krasnoyarsky District, Astrakhan Oblast, Russia. The population was 31 as of 2010. There are 4 streets.

Geography 
It is located 3 km north from Krasny Yar.

References 

Rural localities in Krasnoyarsky District, Astrakhan Oblast